Kristjan Port (born 9 May 1960 in Tallinn) is an Estonian sport biologist.

2008–2015, he was the head of Tallinn University's Institute of Health Sciences and Sport Institute.

Since 2008, he is a member of Estonian Anti-Doping Foundation.

In 2020, he was awarded with Order of the White Star, III class.

References

Living people
1960 births
Estonian biologists
Estonian sportspeople
University of Tartu alumni
Tallinn University alumni
Academic staff of Tallinn University
Recipients of the Order of the White Star, 3rd Class
People from Tallinn
Sportspeople from Tallinn